Troy Airport  is a public airport located one mile (2 km) northwest of the central business district of Troy, a city in Lincoln County, Montana, United States. It is owned by the United States Forest Service and is situated between U.S. Highway 2 and the Kootenai River in the Kootenai National Forest.

Facilities and aircraft 
For the 12-month period ending August 25, 2005, the airport had 700 general aviation aircraft operations, an average of 58 per month.

References

External links 

Airports in Montana
Buildings and structures in Lincoln County, Montana
Transportation in Lincoln County, Montana